(Spanish, 'Tell me how it happened'), usually shortened to Cuéntame and also known in English as Remember When, is a Spanish prime-time television drama series which has been broadcast on La 1 of Televisión Española since 2001. It recounts the experiences of a middle-class family, the Alcántaras, during the last years of the rule of Francisco Franco and the Spanish transition to democracy.

Cuéntame cómo pasó has received critical acclaim throughout most of its run and has received numerous national and international awards making it the most awarded series in the history of television in Spain. With twenty-two seasons, 406 episodes and eight unnumbered special episodes it is also the longest running scripted prime-time Spanish series in the history of television.

With a stable cast led by Imanol Arias and Ana Duato as Antonio Alcántara and Mercedes Fernández, more than three thousand performers have appeared in the series.

Production

Development
Cuéntame cómo pasó was created to celebrate the first twenty-five years since Spain's transition to democracy, and its didactic spirit is clearly evident in some of the episodes. In special themed episodes it includes documentary interviews with historical figures of the era speaking about how they experienced important historic acts like the assassination of then Prime Minister Luis Carrero Blanco or the death of Francisco Franco.

Initially the series was to be titled Nuestro Ayer, but it finally was titled Cuéntame. This name comes from the 1960s well-known song used as the series opening theme. In March 2002, during the first season, the title was changed to Cuéntame cómo pasó because Cuéntame was already registered.

The first episode was broadcast on 13 September 2001. The series begins in April 1968 with the arrival of television to the house of the Alcántaras just in time to watch the victory of Massiel at the Eurovision Song Contest. The story reflects the changes in Spain beginning that day. Through situations, characters, and attitudes of the era, the series evokes a wistful reminiscence of those times. In this respect it can be compared to the series The Wonder Years, which did the same thing for US history.

In March 2020, TVE and Grupo Ganga announced that the series, after its twentieth season, would be renewed for two more seasons, with the storyline moving firmly into the 1990s. On 16 February 2023, TVE green-lighted the production of season twenty-three that will close the series with the storyline ending in 2001.

Season twenty-one marks the first time that the series breaks its premise of narrating the past from the present to show the present. The events in both times are shown for the first time, with the characters facing 1992 and the COVID-19 pandemic alternately.

Theme song and title sequence
The song underwent eleven different arrangements and musical styles over the years and is performed by well-known singers. The first version is sung by Ana Belén and David San José and is used in the first nine seasons. The third version is sung by Rosario Flores, titled her ninth studio album, and is used in season eleven. The fifth version is sung by Estrella Morente and is used in season thirteen. The sixth version is sung by Miguel Bosé and is used in season fourteen. The seventh version is sung by the rock band Los Secretos and is used in seasons fifteen and sixteen. The eighth version is sung by Miguel Ríos and is used in seasons seventeen, eighteen and nineteen. The ninth version is sung by Ana Torroja and is used in season twenty. The tenth version is sung by Rozalén and is used in season twenty-one. The eleventh version is sung by Raphael and is used in season twenty-two.

Awards
Cuéntame cómo pasó has received critical acclaim throughout most of its run and has received numerous national and international awards, including the first National Television Award awarded by the Spanish Ministry of Culture in 2009, two Premios Ondas (the International Television Award in 2002 and for Best National Television Series in 2003), three New York Latin ACE Awards (for Best Scenic Program in Television in 2008 and Special Awards for Imanol Arias in 2009 and Ana Duato in 2010) and a Silver Bird Prize in the Seoul International Drama Awards as the runner-up for Best Drama Series in 2007. It was also nominated for the International Emmy Award for Best Drama Series in 2003. The series, its cast and its technical staff have received more than a hundred awards overall.

International versions

In other media
A short clip from the series' first episode was shown at the 2012 Summer Olympics opening ceremony in London among clips of famous British television programmes, music videos and films as part of "Frankie and June say...thanks Tim" sequence.

Plot 
Antonio Alcántara (Imanol Arias) and Mercedes Fernández (Ana Duato) are a married couple that have emigrated in the 1960s from Sagrillas, a (fictional) small village in the province of Albacete, to San Genaro, a (also fictional) working-class suburb in Madrid, along with her mother Herminia (María Galiana) and their three children, Inés (Irene Visedo), Toni (Pablo Rivero) and Carlos (Ricardo Gómez) seeking a better life away from the hardships of an impoverished countryside. Antonio works as an office assistant at the Ministry of Agriculture headquarters in the mornings and at Don Pablo's (José Sancho) printing house in the afternoons. Mercedes and Herminia make trousers for a department store at home while doing the housekeeping. Inés works at Nieves' hair salon across the street along with Pili (Lluvia Rojo), Toni is starting a law degree, making him the first Alcántara going to university and Carlos spends his school days with his best friends Josete and Luis (Manuel Dios). With great effort and hard work they are able to purchase in instalments their first television set, their first washing machine, their first car (a SEAT 800) and even spend their first vacations at Benidorm where they see the sea for the first time.

As time goes by, Antonio leaves his jobs at the Ministry and the printing house to work for Don Pablo in other business ventures. One of them, the building company Construcciones Nueva York turns out to be a large fraud planned by Don Pablo and his partners in order to embezzle the funds and blame Antonio. Antonio is taken to court, the truth is revealed in the trial and finally Don Pablo is convicted and imprisoned. After this, he starts working in another printing house, Gráficas Usillos, a business that he eventually purchases and renames Alcántara Rotopress. He stands in the first free democratic general election after Franco's death, on the list of UCD for the Congress of Deputies for the Albacete constituency. He does not get the seat but he is directly appointed by Adolfo Suárez, General Director of Agrarian Production of the Ministry of Agriculture under the Second Suárez Cabinet, a position in the same office where he worked in a subordinate role years before. With his new position and with the printing house running well, the family is able to move their residence from the humble San Genaro to the upper class Salamanca neighbourhood. He sells the printing house, is removed from the position in the Ministry and he starts a flags and banners factory named Estandartes y Banderas alongside his best friend Desi (Roberto Cairo). When the Banco de Granada, the bank where Antonio and Mercedes have all their savings and the mortgage of the Salamanca neighbourhood apartment, declares bankruptcy, their financial situation becomes precarious and they have to move back to San Genaro, selling their luxurious apartment at a loss in order to cover their debts. After this, he starts an olive oil distribution business with his brother Miguel (Juan Echanove), but their business is ruined when they are falsely accused of causing the toxic oil syndrome. Antonio becomes addicted to gambling, his health worsens when he develops angina and he has an affair that puts his marriage in jeopardy. With the money recovered from the Banco de Granada years after its bankruptcy, and the land the family own in Sagrillas, they open up the vineyard and winery Bodega Alcántara Fernández e Hijos and they run the business until a devastating fire destroys the winery. He starts a travel agency named Viajes Milano and he even gets a licence to drive coaches.

Mercedes, tired of sewing trousers, starts to design and sell her own outfits. The sales go well, so she teams up with Nieves to open a boutique named Meyni in the hair salon premises, hiring Pili as shop assistant and using the back room as a workshop. As the business prospers, Don Pablo decides to invest his money in it, and the clothing production is moved to a fully equipped dressmaking factory at Don Pablo's premises, hiring a team of dressmakers and even hiring Antonio and Desi as salesmen. Meyni reaches its peak of success when they run a fashion show in front of Carmen Polo, but the company does not outlast the economic crisis and they eventually have to close the factory. After Nieves' departure, Mercedes teams up with Pili to convert the boutique into a unisex hair salon. After giving birth to María, the Alcántaras' fourth child, she decides to finish her secondary school studies and even completes a degree in Economics. She also works for some time as a real estate agent. She suffers a health scare when she is diagnosed with breast cancer and has a mastectomy. With her experience in design and in the fashion industry she starts a firm to make swimwear for women recovering from mastectomies and once completely recovered she is one of the first women in Spain to undergo a breast reconstruction. In the family winery she takes care of the bookkeeping. To help battered women in a shelter she teaches them sewing first and she transforms the sewing workshop into a firm to make clothing for women of all sizes later.

Inés, after breaking up with her lifelong boyfriend, travels to London with Nieves. There she falls in love with Mike (William Miller) and she decides not to come back. When they break up, she returns and she starts an acting career with the help of Eugenio (Pere Ponce), the new San Genaro parish's young priest. When Mike appears in Madrid looking for her, she decides to follow him to Ibiza to live in a hippie commune. Antonio and Mercedes try by all means to take her back but she doesn't return until she becomes disillusioned with her life there. Back in Madrid she helps Eugenio with the social events in the parish. They spend so much time together that they finally fall in love. Eugenio undergoes secularization and they get married. Inés continues with her acting career and she is wrongly linked with a member of the terrorist group ETA for which she is arrested and imprisoned. When released, whilst awaiting court and pregnant, she decides to escape to France with Eugenio, where their son Antonio Oriol is born and where they break up. Later she moves to Argentina with Oriol. She is able to return to Spain after the amnesty is promulgated. Once in Madrid she gets into La Movida Madrileña nightlife scene and becomes addicted to drugs, while Oriol lives with Eugenio in Cuenca. When the family becomes aware of her addiction, they take her to Sagrillas and help her to get clean. After this, her acting career starts to take off, having the leading role in several movies and stage plays. When Eugenio dies in a car accident, Inés takes Oriol to live with her. In the family winery she helps Antonio with the foreign orders. She has a relationship with Marcos (Carlos Cuevas) for some time. After many years apart, she runs into Mike and they end up getting married.

Toni becomes embroiled in political struggle while finishing his degree, along with his young love Marta (Anna Allen), actively protesting against the Régime. After university, he does his compulsory military service and starts working as a journalist in the newspaper . There he is paired up with Juana, a photographer, whom he falls in love with and finally marries in Gibraltar. In the meantime, he quits his job at the newspaper when he is hired by Antonio to manage a magazine he is launching and to run his printing house. Later, he leaves those jobs to join a firm of labour lawyers. His marriage does not last long and Juana leaves him. After the separation and losing his job, he moves to Rome from where he returns immediately after he finds out about Mercedes' illness. Back in Madrid he starts working in a radio station. Two years after their breakup, he runs into Juana who is accompanied by a little boy named Santiago (Víctor Garrido). Juana later reveals that she was pregnant when she left him, and that Santiago is his son. While broadcasting live on the radio from the Congress of Deputies the vote to elect Leopoldo Calvo Sotelo as the country's new Prime Minister, he witnesses the 23-F coup d'état attempt from inside the Congress building. He moves to London, where Juana is living, to be near his son for some time. Back in Madrid he starts working as an investigative journalist, and puts his life in danger investigating several shady dealings. Fearing for his life and wanting to avoid putting his family in danger, he flees to London. When accepting a position in Televisión Española's news service, he decides to return to Madrid with his new fiancée Deborah (Paloma Bloyd), and he becomes a Telediario news anchor first and an Informe Semanal reporter later. Toni and Deborah get married and they have a daughter named Sol. He leaves his job in television when he is appointed General Director of Informative Relations under the Third González Cabinet.

Carlos spends his childhood going to school and playing in a vacant lot with Josete and Luis. He drives Antonio, Mercedes and Herminia crazy because he is a restless child. When he is in high school, Karina (Elena Rivera) and her mother move into the apartment next door. He gets into reading and writing and he wins a prize with a short story he writes. He starts dating Karina but the relationship has its ups and downs. Instead of starting a degree upon finishing high school, he decides to do his compulsory military service. There he meets Marcelo. After service, he starts a degree in Business Management in a private university, but he does not finish the first year. He opens a nightclub and he is accused of drug dealing. As he does not betray his business partner, who is the dealer, he is arrested and imprisoned. In prison he is attacked and almost dies, but is released when found to be innocent. After prison, he continues to write and he even publishes his first novel. He is also in a long sporadic relationship with Julia (Claudia Traisac), his summer love from Sagrillas. When finding Luis in a bad way, he takes him to Sagrillas and helps him to recover, while taking care of the winery. When recovered, Luis takes over the winery's everyday management. Josete and Marcelo join them in Sagrillas and they all help Carlos to start a rural tourism small lodging named La Casa de Doña Pura as it is the former cottage of his deceased grandmother Pura (Terele Pávez). Karina marries another man and, after a one-night stand with Carlos, gets pregnant. She gives birth to a baby, Olivia, although it is not clear if she is Carlos' daughter or not, and when her husband finds out about the infidelity, they break up. Carlos takes care of her and the baby and, finally, he proposes and they get married. After some time working as a motorcycle courier he starts working in an advertising agency. Karina accepts a position in New York, Carlos follows her and there he starts to write down his family's story from the beginning.

The Alcántaras' story is narrated from an indefinite present by an adult Carlos (voiced by Carlos Hipólito). Their story is directly and indirectly affected by the events and the social, economical and political changes occurring in Spain from the late 1960s until the early 1990s. The Alcántaras are also direct and indirect witnesses of the historic acts occurring those days, including, among many others, when Antonio, Mercedes, Carlos and Miguel witness the car bombing that kills Prime Minister Luis Carrero Blanco; when Toni chronicles the Portuguese Carnation Revolution from Lisbon; when all the family queue for hours at Franco's funeral chapel; when Carlos, Karina and Josete get trapped in the Alcalá 20 nightclub fire; when Antonio and Mercedes take part in the famous game show Un, dos, tres... responda otra vez; when all the family leave El Descanso restaurant just as it suffers a terrorist attack; when Antonio proudly attends, at the Royal Palace, the solemn signing of the agreement by which Spain and Portugal joined the European Economic Community; when Inés, Marcos and Oriol come out of the Hipercor bombing unscathed; when Toni reports live from Berlin the fall of the Wall; when Toni and his cameraman are kidnapped in Iraq during the Gulf War and when Antonio, Mercedes, Toni and Oriol attend the opening ceremony of the 1992 Summer Olympics.

Cast and characters

Alcántara Family

Friends and acquaintances 

More than three thousand other performers have appeared in the series. Many established actors, or who had a breakout role later, have had recurring or guest roles throughout the series, including Susana Abaitua, María José Alfonso, Anna Allen, Héctor Alterio, Javier Ambrossi, Enrique Arce, Raúl Arévalo, Carmen Balagué, Elena Ballesteros, Pilar Bardem, Icíar Bollaín, María Botto, Pedro Casablanc, Carles Canut, Óscar Casas, Pilar Castro, Víctor Clavijo, Adrià Collado, Luis Cuenca, Gemma Cuervo, Ruth Díaz, Israel Elejalde, Asier Etxeandia, Fiorella Faltoyano, Fernando Fernán Gómez, Greta Fernández, Alba Flores, Nacho Fresneda, Elena Furiase, Ginés García Millán, Ariadna Gil, Bárbara Goenaga, Agustín González, Fernando Guillén, Itziar Ituño, José Lifante, Charo López, José Luis López Vázquez, Kiti Mánver, Cristina Marcos, Juan Margallo, Sílvia Marsó, Maria de Medeiros, Melody, Natalia Millán, Irene Montalà, Guillermo Montesinos, Álvaro Morte, Sergio Mur, Marta Nieto, Nancho Novo, Francesc Orella, Antonio Pagudo, Javier Pereira, Blanca Portillo, Brendan Price, Juanjo Puigcorbé, Jordi Rebellón, Miguel Rellán, Antonio Resines, Mabel Rivera, Paco Sagarzazu, Susi Sánchez, Alejo Sauras, Julieta Serrano, Emma Suárez, Adriana Torrebejano, Claudia Traisac, Unax Ugalde, Antonio Valero, Manuela Velasco, Pastora Vega, Juan Carlos Vellido and Luis Zahera.

In addition to the fictional characters, many well-known real characters of the time have also appeared in the series with the use of different techniques, from the insertion of footage from Televisión Española archive with CGI techniques to the use of actors to play them. The only three people who have played their thirty years younger selves have been politician Santiago Carrillo, film director Fernando Colomo and musician Ariel Rot.

Episodes 

The series has also eight additional unnumbered special episodes not counted in the official episodes numeration. Season three, season twenty and season twenty-two finish, season seven, season eight and the second part of season nineteen start and season twenty-one and season twenty-two rest mid-season with one of those unnumbered special episodes each.

References

Further reading

External links 
  
 Official production website
 Cuéntame cómo pasó at RTVE Play 
 

Television series about the history of Spain
La 1 (Spanish TV channel) network series
2001 Spanish television series debuts
Television series set in the 1960s
Television series set in the 1970s
Television series set in the 1980s
Television series set in the 1990s
Television shows set in Madrid
2000s Spanish drama television series
2010s Spanish drama television series
2020s Spanish drama television series
Television series by Grupo Ganga